Valeriana estonica is a species of flowering plant, belonging to the genus Valeriana.

It is endemic to Estonia.

References

estonica
Flora of Estonia